When Good Ghouls Go Bad is a 2001 Fox Family television film based on a book by R. L. Stine. The story is set in the fictional town of Walker Falls, Minnesota, during the Halloween season. It stars Christopher Lloyd and was directed by Patrick Read Johnson, who also co-wrote it.

Plot 

Danny Walker (Joe Pichler), and his father, James (Tom Amandes), who has gotten a divorce from his wife, have just moved to the town of Walker Falls from Chicago so his father can fulfill his dream of re-opening the family chocolate factory. Danny and James are staying with James' father, known by all as "Uncle Fred" (Christopher Lloyd). Uncle Fred is considered crazy and is a bit childish, but Danny loves him very much. Danny dislikes his new life in Walker Falls, and it seems no one likes him, especially the football coach Mike Kankel (Joe Clements) and his son, Ryan (Craig Marriott), the school's biggest bully. The only people who seem to be nice to Danny are his crush, Dayna Stenson (Brittany Byrnes) and Taylor Morgan (Imelda Corcoran), the school nurse, James' childhood friend, and Dayna's mother.

Danny is surprised by how few decorations are up with Halloween only a week away. The people of Walker Falls do not seem to be making any effort at all to celebrate the holiday. Sheriff Ed Frady (Alan Flower) even takes down the decorations that Danny puts up. When walking home from school, Ryan and his pal, Leo (Daniel Karr) push him into the cemetery, lock the gate, and tell him that Walker Falls does not celebrate Halloween because of the legend of a curse.

20 years ago, Curtis Danko (Brendan McCarthy), an artistic boy, was ostracized by "normal" people. When a competition was held for all the eighth graders to design a sculpture of their personal hero, Curtis kept his project covered during the day, then came to school at night to work by the light of captured fireflies. On Halloween night, Mike Kankel and his friends were walking by the school when they saw Curtis from the window, at work on his sculpture. When Kankel returned the next day, he noticed the kiln had been on all night and ran all out of fuel. He opened the door and found Curtis's charred skeleton and a message in the ashes, saying that if the town ever celebrated another Halloween, he would come back and destroy them all. Kankel was struck blind for three days after seeing Curtis' finished statue. Everyone in the town believed the threat and, since then, Halloween has never been celebrated.

Danny thinks it is a silly story, and runs home. James is rarely around, so Uncle Fred serves as a stand-in father for Danny. That night, James is planning to announce his "Halloween Spooktacular" idea to raise funds to re-open Walker Chocolates at the town meeting. Uncle Fred and Danny try to tell him that the townspeople will be too afraid to support the Spooktacular because of the curse, but James will not listen.  At the meeting, Mayor Churney (Roy Billing) announces James, who is surprised to find the people of Walker Falls shudder at just the mention of Halloween. To bring the conversation back on track, his secretary passes out samples of chocolate, and James almost wins them over, but when he reveals his Spooktacular plans, the townspeople are terrified and run out of the building.

The next morning, there is a commotion outside the house. Halloween decorations are all over town, and a large pile of pumpkins has been discovered in the town square. When Uncle Fred lifts a pumpkin as he says "Happy Halloween", the entire pile rolls on top of him, killing him. Everyone in town is at Uncle Fred's funeral and Danny is very sad. As a memento, he lets his grandfather's favorite car shoot down the track and rest with his coffin.

However, because of Uncle Fred's love of Halloween, the magic in the cemetery allows him to return as a zombie. Unfortunately, that same magic awakes others from their slumber, including Curtis. The zombies begin capturing all the townsfolk and gathering them to the creepy old Victorian style house chanting the phrase "Statue." Meanwhile, Danny and Dayna try to explain to James and Nurse Taylor the situation. Uncle Fred reveals his zombie self to his son and Nurse Taylor, both fainting in the process. Zombies break into the house and Uncle Fred explains that Curtis might be behind the zombies awakening and tells them to escape while he holds the other zombies off. Unfortunately, he, his son, and Nurse Taylor are all captured, one of the zombies stating that Uncle Fred was the main part of the plan. Dayna pleads to stop and blames herself for trying to celebrate Halloween. Danny blames himself for being a coward and not standing up for himself.

When everyone is gathered, Curtis reveals himself to the people. As he is about to reveal his statue, he is attacked and literally torn apart by Kankel. However, because Curtis is a zombie, he manages to pull himself together, and scare the wits out of Kankel. As Curtis pulls the shroud off of his statue, everyone covers their eyes in fear. Surprisingly, nothing happens. Everyone uncovers their eyes and Curtis' statue is revealed to be of Uncle Fred. Curtis then shows Uncle Fred a picture of the two of them, Uncle Fred shaking Curtis' hand, as it implied that Curtis looked up to him. Uncle Fred, still guilty about Curtis' death, wonders why he was a hero to Curtis as it was his kiln that killed him. Curtis then turns to Kankel and points to him, naming him as his killer.

Kankel confesses that the night Curtis died, he was working on the statue of Uncle Fred and as a prank to scare him, Kankel, Frady, and his group pushed Curtis into the kiln and locked him in it while taunting him. Suddenly, the janitor appeared and Kankel's group ran off. While cleaning the class, the janitor accidentally turned on the kiln; not realizing Curtis was in it. The next day, Kankel went inside the kiln and saw Curtis' corpse as well as the completed statue of Uncle Fred. To hide his crime, he made up the curse by pretending his eyes were burned when he saw the statue to make it seem like it was Curtis' doing. Kankel also reveals that the statue of Uncle Fred would have been voted to be put in town square, instead of Kankel's statue of his own father. It's revealed that Uncle Fred donated much time and money to the town's children, promoting creativity and imagination; thus, he was loved by many children; explaining why he was called "Uncle Fred" and why much of his actions were seen as childish to some. Kankel wouldn't stand for someone to promote things that were "girly" and wanted things "manly."  Danny looks at Kankel with disgust because Danny got bullied and became a coward because of him. Kankel robbed the town of Halloween for 20 years. However, Kankel's action earns him the wrath of his father, Pops Kankel (Gordon Boyd), who is among the group of zombies and is upset at what he has done. He then grabs his son's ear and drags him out to "give him a whooping he won't forget for the rest of his years."

By the end, the zombies and the townspeople applaud Curtis' statue. With that, Curtis has accomplished what he's done and bids farewell to the town, disappearing into the night, returning to his crypt to finally rest. Meanwhile, the other zombies bid farewell. Uncle Fred reconciles with James, saying this will be the last time he will see him on Earth, but he'll always be watching him on the other side. Danny and the others realize that they apologized and blame themselves for nothing and regretting believing Kankel's lies. He then leaves with his wife, Dolores (Jenny Dibley) and the two join the other zombies, sharing one final dance with the fireflies, as all the entities slowly disappear dancing into the night. Danny and Dayna share a kiss, while James and Taylor hold hands as they watch the dancing zombies fade into the night. The town decides to celebrate Halloween once again.

By the end, German investors that spoke to James earlier love the concept of Halloween and decide to support him into reopening the family chocolate factory within two weeks. On Halloween day, children are seen dressing up in costumes and going trick-or-treating as a girl from one of the Halloween groups goes to Uncle Fred's statue in town square, where they're passing by, and says "Happy Halloween." Then, after the girl leaves, Uncle Fred's voice is heard one last time replying back "Happy Halloween."

Cast

Reception
Derrick Carter from For the Love of Celluloid gave the film an C+ and wrote: "[When Good Ghouls Go Bad] is a decent Halloween flick that will entertain children and offer them a little more risky material that's usually associated with R.L. Stine's tales. It won't annoy adults either, even if some scenes are stupid to say the least. It's far better than recent offerings (Vampire Dog, anyone?), but not as good as something like The Haunting Hour: Don't Think About It (which is also geared at a little older age group). If you're looking for a decent family flick to watch at home and want to see Christopher Lloyd as a charismatic zombie, Good Ghouls should satisfy on both accounts." Richard Scheib from Moria.co gave it two and a half stars, stating: "The majority of children's made-for-television genre movies are completely forgettable – the Disney Channel churns them out by the barrow load. When Good Ghouls Go Bad, which was made for the Fox Network, is surprisingly decent. There are some very nice pieces of writing – like one speech that goes on about considering the beauty of death and cellular disintegration. Or a line like ‘If you don’t survive being scared as a kid, you're not going to survive being scared as an adult,' where you can almost detect R.L. Stine's authorship as an instant response geared to deal with questions about the justification for scaring children."

When Good Ghouls Go Bad won on Australian Guild of Screen Composers for "Best Music for a Mini-Series or Telemovie". The film also was nominated for one DVD Exclusive Awards in the category of "Best Actor" (for Lloyd).

References

External links
 When Good Ghouls Go Bad at Internet Movie Database
  

ABC Family original films
2001 television films
2001 films
Children's horror films
Films set in Minnesota
American films about Halloween
Films based on works by R. L. Stine
Films directed by Patrick Read Johnson